Dillingham is a surname. Notable people with the surname include: 

Benjamin Franklin Dillingham (1844–1918), American businessman
Charles Dillingham (1868–1934), American theatre manager and producer
Craig Dillingham (born 1958), American country music artist
Francis Dillingham (died 1625), English Protestant scholar, cleric and Bible translator
Jay B. Dillingham (1910–2007), American businessman
Kate Dillingham, American cellist 
Kathleen Dillingham, American politician
Kenny Dillingham (born c.1990), American football coach
Pat Dillingham (born 1983), American football player
Paul Dillingham (1799–1891), American lawyer and politician.
Richard Dillingham (1823–1850), American Quaker school teacher
Rick Dillingham (1952–1994), American ceramic artist
Steven Dillingham, 25th director of the United States Census Bureau
Theophilus Dillingham (1613–1678), English churchman and academic
Walter F. Dillingham (1875–1963), American  industrialist and businessman
William Dillingham (academic) (c. 1617–1689), English academic
William P. Dillingham (1843–1923), American attorney and politician